The 2008 season is the 99th season in Sport Club Internacional's existence, and their 38th in the Campeonato Brasileiro, having never been relegated from the top division.

Club

The Management

Team kit
The team kit for the season was produced by Reebok and the shirt sponsor is Banrisul.

Squad

Most frequent start

Transfers

Transfers in

Transfers out

Players on loan

Season 2008

Dubai Cup

Matches

Friendly

Campeonato Gaúcho

Matches

Classification
Group 2

Quarter-finals

Semi-finals

Finals

Results summary

Pld = Matches played; W = Matches won; D = Matches drawn; L = Matches lost;

Copa do Brasil

First round

Second round

Round of 16

Quarter-finals

Campeonato Brasileiro

Matches

Classification

Results summary

Pld = Matches played; W = Matches won; D = Matches drawn; L = Matches lost;

Copa Sudamericana

First round

Round of 16

Quarter-finals

Semi-finals

Finals

External links
First Squad (pt)
Campeonato Gaúcho fixtures and  results (pt)
Fixtures and results · UOL.com.br (pt)

2008
Internacional